Tomato Morning is a tour-only EP by Maryland-based indie folk band Page France. It was released on Suicide Squeeze Records in 2006.

Track listing
"Without a Diamond Ring" - 2:55
"Give Him A Blanket" - 3:10
"Who Cracked Your Egg?" - 3:06
"Tomato Morning" - 3:17

External links
SuicideSqueeze.net

Suicide Squeeze Records albums
2006 albums
Page France albums